Bay Minette Municipal Airport  is a city government-owned public-use airport located  southwest of the central business district of Bay Minette, a city in Baldwin County, Alabama, United States.

Facilities and aircraft 
For the 12-month period ending March 2, 2006, the airport had 8,416 general aviation aircraft operations.

References

External links 
 Bay Minette Airport

Airports in Baldwin County, Alabama